Sigy may refer to:

Places
 Sigy, Seine-et-Marne, France
 Sigy-en-Bray, France
 Sigy-le-Châtel, France

Other
 Sigy (horse) (foaled 1976), French racehorse and broodmare
 Prix Sigy, French horse race